The 1957–58 season was the 85th season of competitive football in Scotland and the 61st season of the Scottish Football League.

Scottish League Division One

Champions: Hearts
Relegated: East Fife, Queen's Park

Scottish League Division Two

Promoted: Stirling Albion, Dunfermline Athletic

Cup honours

Other honours

National

County

 – aggregate over two legs – replay

Highland League

Scotland national team

Scotland qualified for the 1958 FIFA World Cup by finishing top of their qualifying group, ahead of Spain and Switzerland. The team went out of the finals at the first round, after one draw and two defeats.

Key:
 (H) = Home match
 (A) = Away match
 (N) = Match played on Neutral ground
 WCQG9 = World Cup qualifying – Group 9
 WCG2 = World Cup – Group 2
 BHC = British Home Championship

Notes and references

External links
Scottish Football Historical Archive

 
Seasons in Scottish football